Pudasjärvi is a town and a municipality of Finland. Pudasjärvi is by area the second largest town in Finland (as of 2006, Rovaniemi is the largest) and one of the largest in the world.

Pudasjärvi is famed for its nature, and is the home of the southernmost fell area in Finland, Syöte.

The oldest dated rock formations within the European Union can be found in Siuruankylä, Pudasjärvi. The trondhjemite gneiss is aged 3,500 million years.

Two Finnish melodic death metal bands, Kalmah and Eternal Tears of Sorrow formed in Pudasjärvi.

The Big Dipper and the bear of the Pudasjärvi's coat of arms are based on the old seal of the parish keeper. The coat of arms was designed by Gustaf von Numers, and the Pudasjärvi town council approved it at its meeting on August 2, 1950. The Ministry of the Interior approved the coat of arms for use on September 26 of the same year.

Politics
Results of the 2011 Finnish parliamentary election in Pudasjärvi:

Centre Party   42.3%
True Finns   32.9%
Left Alliance   10.9%
Social Democratic Party   5.0%
National Coalition Party   4.4%
Green League   2.5%
Christian Democrats   1.3%
Change 2011   0.2%
Swedish People's Party   0.1%
Pirate Party   0.1%
Communist Party of Finland   0.1%
Communist Workers Party   0.1%

See also
 Kouva
 Pudasjärvi Airfield

References

External links

Town of Pudasjärvi – Official site

 
Cities and towns in Finland
Populated places established in 1865